This is a list of notable people from Port Elizabeth, in South Africa.

Notable people 
Karl Bauermeister - cricketer
Johan Botha – cricketer
Schalk Burger – rugby union player; 2004 IRB International Player of the Year
Adrienne Camp – singer-songwriter
Thinus Delport – rugby union player
Sophia De Bruyn – politician
Russell Domingo – cricket coach
Andrew Edge - artist
Kermit Erasmus - footballer
Ami Faku - singer and songwriter 
Athol Fugard – Playwright, novelist
Danie Gerber – rugby union player
 Heavy-K - DJ and Music Producer
Danny Jordaan – 2010 FIFA world cup organising committee boss
Len Killeen – rugby union player
Daine Klate - football (soccer) player
Siya Kolisi – rugby union Player
Saki Macozoma - former political prisoner, businessman 
Mzi Mahola - poet and author living in Zwide township
Zolani Mahola – actress and singer-songwriter with the band Freshlyground
Carl Mork – rugby league player 
Hans Mork – rugby league player 
Shashi Naidoo – actress and TV anchor
Zim Ngqawana – jazz musician
Winston Ntshona – playwright and actor
Ashton Nyte - musician
Wayne Parnell – cricketer
Alviro Petersen – cricketer
Robin Peterson – cricketer
Shawn Phillips – singer-songwriter
Graeme Pollock – cricketer
Peter Pollock – cricketer
Shaun Pollock – cricketer
Ashwell Prince – cricketer
Moonchild Sanelly - singer, dancer
Tanya Seymour - Olympic equestrian
Patrick Soon-Shiong – billionaire entrepreneur and philanthropist; part-owner of the LA Lakers; graduate of PE's Chinese High School
Reeva Steenkamp – model
Mzwandile Stick – rugby union player; former captain of the National 7s Team; Backline coach for the South African Rugby Team.
Elrio van Heerden - footballer
Joe van Niekerk – rugby union player
Danny Williams - best known for his rendition of Moon River theme song
Nikki Williams – singer-songwriter*
Ronwen Williams - footballer

References

Port Elizabeth
Port Elizabeth